The China Initiative was an effort by the United States Department of Justice to prosecute perceived Chinese spies in American research and industry, in order to combat economic espionage. Launched in November 2018, it has been criticized as racist and ineffective. Some of the cases under the China Initiative were based on false evidence provided by the FBI. The Department of Justice announced the end of the program on February 23, 2022, amid criticism of racial profiling of Chinese American citizens and other residents of Chinese origin or ancestry.

Origin 

The China Initiative was a program to prosecute certain science researchers and academics affiliated with China. It was begun by the Department of Justice (DOJ) under then–US President Donald Trump's first Attorney General Jeff Sessions in 2018, with the goal of preventing industrial espionage. Trump and his administration believed that China was using researchers and students to steal American technological innovations.

The DOJ maintains that there is no strict definition of what a China Initiative case is, but most of the cases involve researchers who failed to disclose Chinese funding on grant applications and many involve professors at US institutions. Despite the initiative's goal of combating espionage, no one was convicted or even charged with spying in any China Initiative case.

End 
On 23 February 2022, the DOJ announced that it was ending the China Initiative, largely due to "perceptions that it unfairly painted Chinese Americans and United States residents of Chinese origin as disloyal." Assistant Attorney General for National Security Matthew Olsen said the decision did not mean the DOJ was abandoning its response to the threat posed by China, but rather that it wanted to pursue that goal differently. According to Olsen, the DOJ will continue to combat threats posed by the Chinese government; it will also continue to pursue the cases begun under the program.

The China Initiative cases typically involved lying or omitting information on disclosure forms. Some cases resulted in convictions, like that of Charles Lieber (who was found guilty of making false statements to federal officials and filing false tax returns) and Meyya Meyyappan (a NASA scientist who pled guilty to making false statements to federal officials). Others have been reined in or abandoned, like that of Gang Chen, or defeated in trial like Anming Hu's. A review of existing cases was conducted and the DOJ is "comfortable with where those cases are."

Aftermath
Although the China Initiative has officially ended, the "climate of fear and anxiety" has not dissipated and scientists are being pressured in other ways according to sources reported by the scientific journal Nature in February 2023. Universities have become more active in "assisting investigations and pursuing potential wrongdoing". Gang Chen states that "The government has not done enough" to allay concerns and "It has only intensified". Jenny Lee, a social scientist at University of Arizona, states that end of the China Initiative provided the illusion that scientists of Chinese descent would receive a reprieve from scrutiny, but the "chilling effect" is still present and the US government has continued to adopt policies and positions perpetuating the narrative that scientists from China are spies. In a survey published in February 2023, a link was found between fear of racial profiling and a desire among scientists to return to China.  

Chinese American scientists who have been caught up in cases such as Xiaoxing Xi and Gang Chen say that they are still afraid of doing research or applying for federal funding while Anming Hu has had trouble securing funding. Chen says that he fears the government would use the application forms against him as they did before. Xi sought damages for the harm he suffered due to his arrest but his claims were dismissed in March 2022. He spends much of his time raising awareness of anti-Asian sentiment as well as following cases of scientists in similar situations. Both Xi and Hu had their team sizes reduced from before their cases and Hu no longer takes on researchers and students from China to avoid risk. Chen also sought to avoid risk by switching research topics to one with less obvious commercial applications while avoiding contact with researchers and students from China. Hu claims that he would have progressed much further in his research level had he not been caught up in the China Initiative.

Criticism 

Under the China Initiative, the FBI opened thousands of investigations, yet setbacks prompted criticism of the program. In July 2021 six cases were dropped, and that September the case of Anming Hu ended with his acquitted, revealing "law enforcement errors and prosecutorial overzealousness."

Ineffectiveness 

According to a Bloomberg News analysis of the 50 indictments displayed on the China Initiative webpage, the program hadn't "been very successful at catching spies." Most of the cases listed by December 17, 2021, involved individual profiteering or career advancement by the accused, rather than state-directed spying. Despite this, many of these indictments portray the alleged thefts as for the benefit of China. Seton Hall University law professor Margaret Lewis described this as "a conflation of individual motives with a country’s policy goals" that has led to the criminalization of "China-ness."

A plurality of the indictments, representing 38% of the cases, charged academic researchers and professors with fraud for failure to disclose relationships with Chinese educational institutions. None of those accused of fraud had been found to have spied for China, and nearly half of those cases had been dropped. Around 20% of the cases involved violations of US sanctions or illegal exports. A smaller percentage concern cyber intrusions attributed to China. Only one fifth of the indictments are about economic espionage and most of them remain unresolved. Only three cases allege that secrets were transferred to Chinese agents. Andrew Lelling, a former US attorney in Boston, Massachusetts, explained that the number of cases regarding disclosure is large because espionage cases take longer to investigate.

Out of 77 known China Initiative cases, 19 involved scientists suspected of having participated in the Thousand Talents Plan, and within that group, 14 were accused of violation of research integrity standards due to failure to disclose all affiliations to Chinese entities on grant documentation. None of the 14 were accused of transferring American intellectual property to China. Of the 28 prosecutions brought forth under the China Initiative, only eight have resulted in convictions or guilty pleas. Only four were professors of Chinese descent and none were convicted for espionage or theft. According to Mark Cohen, a law school fellow at the University of California, Berkeley, "The government is settling for charges that have little to do with technology."

Zhengdong Cheng was imprisoned for 13 months after being arrested in August 2020. In September 2022, he was convicted for two charges of making false statements. Despite his conviction, Science characterized Cheng as "the latest case to crumble under the Department of Justice’s (DOJ’s) China Initiative" because the majority of the nine counts of defrauding the government and making false statements charged against him were overturned. Cheng admitted to failure to disclose his work for Guangdong University of Technology and Southern University of Science and Technology during the NASA grant application process. He was sentenced to the 13 months of imprisonment he had already served since August 2020, a fine of $20,000, and a repayment of $86,876 to NASA.

Inconsistencies 

Civil rights groups have pointed to inconsistencies in the DOJ's messaging on the China Initiative. An MIT Technology Review investigation found that the DOJ did not provide a clear definition of a China Initiative case or disclose how many cases it included. The lack of transparency, the investigation claims, makes it impossible to understand what exactly the program was, what its achievements were, and what the costs have been for those affected. According to Jeremy Wu of the APA Justice Task Force, without a precise definition of the boundaries and scope of the China Initiative, information could be manipulated and presented so as to fit the government's narrative.

Some cases that were publicly described as China Initiative cases were absent from the program's webpage, including that of MIT professor Gang Chen. Chen was accused of failure to disclose contracts, appointments, and awards from Chinese entities while taking federal grants from the Department of Energy. A letter to MIT president Leo Rafael Reif from 170 MIT faculty members claimed that this was not true and presented several refutations of the allegations against Chen. The MIT president asserted that the contract in question was between MIT and a Chinese university, the Southern University of Science and Technology (SUSTech), to provide MIT with $25 million over five years. MIT paid for Chen's legal defense. Prosecutors recommended dropping charges against Chen and the US District Court dismissed the case in January 2022.

Other cases, including that of Cleveland Clinic researcher Qing Wang, were removed from the webpage after charges were dismissed. MIT Technology Review found that only 13 of 23 research integrity cases were listed on the webpage. Seven of those ended in dismissals and acquittals, and were removed. Of the 12 cases involving theft of trade secrets or economic espionage, only 10 were listed, and seven were charged with only theft of trade secrets but not espionage. Only one case charged both theft and espionage. MIT analysis showed that 17 cases and 39 defendants were removed from the China Initiative webpage while two cases and five defendants were added.

On 19 November, two days after MIT Technology Review approached the DOJ with questions about the China Initiative, significant revisions were made to the China Initiative webpage. Some items were deleted while other items were added. A former DOJ official suggested the webpage may have been organized less clearly than warranted given the scale and impact of the program. Some cases, such as one involving a turtle-smuggling ring (which was later removed), may have been added to it by mistake. According to the official, such errors may have been due to a new staff member's zeal in looking for cases with a "nexus to China."

FBI misconduct 

The first prosecution of the China Initiative, the Trial of Anming Hu, resulted in a hung jury and mistrial in June 2021, and Hu's acquittal in September 2021. Anming Hu is an associate professor in the Department of Mechanical, Aerospace and Biomedical Engineering at the University of Tennessee, Knoxville (UTK). Hu was fired in 2020 pursuant to the case against him, and reinstated in 2022.  He was charged with three counts of fraud and three counts of making false statements after 21 months of FBI surveillance failed to find any evidence of espionage.

In Hu's first trial it was revealed that the FBI knowingly built a case based on false evidence, obtained Hu's university documents without warrant, spied on Hu and his family, and attempted to coerce Hu to spy on China for the United States. The FBI agent in charge of the case, Kujtim Sadiku, did not believe that Hu was guilty of being involved with the Chinese military but gave a PowerPoint presentation to UTK administration designed to make them think he was. According to Hu's defense lawyer, Sadiku wanted a case badly enough that he went forward with questionable evidence. UTK aided the FBI in their investigation by providing Hu's university documents without a warrant, concealing the investigation from him, misleading NASA, and suspending him without pay as soon as he was arrested. Meetings were conducted between Hu's bosses and the FBI, but it is unclear who authorized them; the FBI did not have any proof of wrongdoing by Hu when they entered UTK and did not have the legal authority to take records from his personnel files. Sadiku admitted that he was not familiar with many of the policies regarding grants which Hu was accused of abusing. One of the jurors described it as "the most ridiculous case" and said the charges against Hu were the result of "a series of plausible errors" on Hu's part, "a lack of support from [UTK], and ruthless ambition on behalf of the FBI." Afterwards, Democratic Representatives Ted Lieu, Mondaire Jones, and Pramila Jayapal voiced concerns about Hu's prosecution and called on Justice Department Inspector General Michael E. Horowitz to investigate allegations of FBI misconduct.

Following the mistrial, the federal government announced that it would pursue a retrial, which ended with Hu's acquittal in September 2021. US District Judge Thomas A. Varlan dismissed the case, saying: "[E]ven viewing all the evidence in the light most favorable to the government, no rational jury could conclude that defendant acted with a scheme to defraud NASA." Casey Arrowood, who lead the failed prosecution of Anming Hu, has been nominated by President Biden for U.S. Attorney General of the Eastern District of Tennessee. Asian American civil rights groups called on supporters to oppose the nomination, which has been described as an "affront to the Asian American, immigrant, and scientific communities." Hu said that instead of being punished, Arrowood is being rewarded, encouraging future cases such as his to happen again.

In the trial of Franklin Feng Tao, evidence used by the Department of Justice was obtained using a search warrant that was given on the basis of manufactured allegations against Tao. These allegations were provided to the FBI in 2019 by an ex-colleague who wanted to sabotage Tao's career. She believed she was not given sufficient credit as a co-author of a paper he worked on, and allegedly demanded $310,000 from him due to "spiritual hurts"; when Tao refused, she threatened to counterattack and report him to the FBI as a "tech spy." The co-author "used fake email accounts to levy the accusations and hacked into Tao’s email, even during a meeting with FBI agents." With that information, the FBI obtained a search warrant. Although the spying accusations did not stick, according to the prosecution, Tao's emails contained a contract to teach in China. Tao's defense said he was only in job discussions and did not sign the contract or take the job which did not constitute a violation of disclosure rules. On September 20, 2022, a federal judge threw out the three convictions of wire fraud against Tao but upheld one count of making a false statement.

The FBI also implemented threat awareness sessions at universities, circulating information singling out China as a threat and labeling students, faculty, and researchers as 'non-traditional collectors'.

Allegations of racial bias 

According to advocacy groups, the prosecutions contributed to worsening US-China tensions and "a 71% rise in incidents of violence against Asian Americans from 2019 to 2020." Asian American advocacy groups described the China Initiative as a new chapter in Asian American history stretching back to Chinese Exclusion Act, the internment of Japanese Americans, and the failed prosecution of Wen Ho Lee in the 1990s. The Committee of 100, a Chinese American advocacy group, characterized the term "non-traditional actors" used to describe researchers with links to China as a way to label Asian Americans as perpetual foreigners. The Committee published a report in September 2021 analyzing 190 economic espionage cases since 1996, which showed that defendants with Asian names faced double the likelihood of false accusations and harsher punishments if convicted. The report showed that over 50% of Chinese scientists and over 50% of Chinese American scientists have become increasingly fearful of working in the United States. An investigation by MIT Technology Review found that 90% of the individuals caught up in the China Initiative by December 2021 were of Chinese descent.

A poll by the Committee of 100 and the University of Arizona in summer 2021 found that four out of ten scientists of Chinese descent had recently considered leaving the U.S. out of fear of government surveillance. According to data gathered by Princeton University, Harvard University and the Massachusetts Institute of Technology, the number of U.S.-trained scientists of Chinese descent who dropped their U.S. based affiliation for a Chinese one increased by 22 percent over the previous year to more than 1,400 in 2021, coinciding with the COVID-19 pandemic as well as the China Initiative. One Chinese mechanical-engineering professor from a top American university said he left for Hong Kong after more than two decades in the U.S. due to aging parents, the tense political environment in America, and his Chineseness putting other collaborating scientists at risk of scrutiny. Fields Medal winner Shing-Tung Yau, one of the highest profile departees, left for Tsinghua University in April 2022. Although he did not respond to a request for comment, he compared the academic environment in the U.S. to the Soviet Union in a speech to Harvard freshmen in September 2021.

In January 2021, APA Justice, the Brennan Center for Justice and Asian Americans Advancing Justice, called for the end of the China Initiative. Their letter to Joe Biden notes that John Charles Demers, assistant attorney general of the National Security Division, directed each of the 94 US attorney's districts to bring forth cases of Chinese espionage or theft without any apparent reason to believe that such crimes were being committed. As a consequence of the program's "pressure on grant makers, universities and research institutions to participate in racial, ethnic and national origin profiling," they claimed, discriminatory and stigmatizing investigations were conducted on people of Chinese descent.

More than 1,600 scholars and administrators from over 200 universities petitioned for the end of the program, which they claimed disproportionately targets researchers of Chinese origin. In September 2021, American Physical Society President Sylvester James Gates said the DOJ should move away from disclosure issues and rename the China Initiative in order to allay concerns over racial profiling. He called for the review of past cases for violations of due process and for the victims to be compensated for damage to their careers, and suggested the government give researchers a timespan in which to correct previous oversights in disclosure. At the same time, 177 Stanford University faculty members sent a letter to the DOJ making similar complaints. They wrote that the program does "not just affect the prosecuted faculty but affect the many more university researchers who are targeted, investigated and feel threatened by inquiries initiated without prior evidence of significant wrongdoing."

Judy Chu, the US representative for  since 2013, said "They have turned the China Initiative into an instrument for racial profiling"  and that "They have turned it into a means to terrorize Chinese scientists and engineers. Something has gone dramatically wrong." Thu Nguyen, the executive director of OCA-Asian Pacific American Advocates, said fears of racial profiling drove some talented scientists to look for work back in China.

Merrick Brian Garland, the new United States attorney general under the Biden administration since March 2021, pledged to review the program. In October, Garland said that there was no place for discrimination, but confirmed that new investigations were being opened on a daily basis. Government spokesman Wyn Hornbuckle wrote in an email that cases were based on conduct and not ethnicity. The FBI claims that there is nothing racially motivated about its China Initiative investigations.

Legal commentary 

The prosecutor in the first announced China Initiative case, John Hemann, said the program had "gone off the rails" and "morphed into something that's completely away from what the point of what this exercise was in the first place." Hemann characterized the problem the China Initiative addressed as political and economic in nature, not one which could be resolved with criminal prosecutions. He later defended a medical researcher, Chen Song, who was charged with visa fraud. Chen was accused of misrepresenting whether she still served the People's Liberation Army. Her case was dropped in July 2021.

Peter Toren, another former federal prosecutor, suggested that charging scientists with failing to report contracts or income from other sources, when they may be unaware of their obligations, might not be the best approach. He urged scientists to learn the dangers of theft but also said that they should understand and advocate for their rights. He recommended seeking professional help before getting caught up in an investigation and to not automatically assume an FBI agent is acting in their best interests.

Andrew Lelling, a former US attorney in Boston, questioned whether the China Initiative was proportional to the amount of espionage actually occurring. He said that an appropriate response to China would not be "just prosecuting people," and that "nuanced foreign policy" would not utilize only the Justice Department. Lelling called for the elimination of certain parts of the program.

See also 

 Anti-Chinese sentiment in the United States
 Human rights in the United States
 Qian Xuesen
 Yellow Peril

References 

 
Asian-American issues
Asian-American-related controversies
United States crime-related lists
China–United States relations
Chinese spies
Espionage in the United States
Xenophobia